The Chapel Street Historic District is a  historic district in the Downtown New Haven area of the city of New Haven, Connecticut.  It was listed on the National Register of Historic Places in 1984. The district covers the southwestern corner of Downtown New Haven, including properties from Park Street to Temple Street between Chapel and Crown streets, and properties from High Street to Temple Street between George and Crown streets.  It is bordered on the north by the New Haven Green and the Yale University campus.  The western edge borders the Dwight Street Historic District.  The eastern and southern edges of the district abut areas of more modern development.

In 1984 the district included, over a 5 and a half block area, 102 buildings, of which 76 were contributing buildings.  The predominantly brick structures represent a wide range of architectural styles.  Maps show that the area was residential in the eighteenth century and through the first quarter of the nineteenth century.  Commercial development began to take over at that time, though residential properties remained well represented.  The oldest building in the district is the Ira Atwater House, built in 1817.  Most of the buildings now in the district were built in the late nineteenth and early twentieth centuries, having replaced earlier residential and commercial development.  One of the oldest surviving commercial buildings in the city is a c. 1831 building on Church Street. There are three church buildings in the district, including the former Calvary Church Baptist Church (1871) which now house the Yale Repertory Theatre.

Gallery

See also
National Register of Historic Places listings in New Haven, Connecticut

References

Historic districts in New Haven, Connecticut
National Register of Historic Places in New Haven, Connecticut
Historic districts on the National Register of Historic Places in Connecticut